Swarrnim Startup & Innovation University (SSIU) is a private university located in the village Bhoyan Rathod, in Gandhinagar district, Gujarat, India. The university was established in 2017 by the Gaya Prasad Jain Charitable Trust through the Gujarat Private Universities (Amendment) Act, 2017, which also established P P Savani University, Karnavati University and Indrashil University.

Academic divisions
The university comprises the following academic divisions:
 Swarrnim Institute of Designs
 Swarrnim School of Business
 Swarrnim Institute of Technology
 Swarrnim Science College
 Swarrnim Institute of Health Science

References

External links

Gandhinagar district
Universities in Gujarat
Educational institutions established in 2017
2017 establishments in Gujarat
Private universities in India